The 2019–20 North Alabama Lions women's basketball team represented University of North Alabama during the 2019–20 NCAA Division I women's basketball season. They were led by head coach Missy Tiber in her seventh season at North Alabama. The Lions played their home games at the Flowers Hall in Florence, Alabama as members of the Atlantic Sun Conference.

This season was North Alabama's second of a four-year transition period from Division II to Division I. As a result, the Lions were not eligible for NCAA postseason play but participated in the ASUN tournament where they advanced to the semifinals.

Previous season
The Lions finished the 2018–19 season 21-9, 10-6 to finish tied in third place in ASUN play. They received an invitation to play in the Women's Basketball Invitational (WBI), where they advanced to the semifinals before losing to North Texas. The season marked the first of a four-year transition period from Division II to Division I.

Schedule and results 

|-
!colspan=12 style=| Non-Conference Regular Season
|-

|-

|-

Source:

References

North Alabama Lions
North Alabama Lions women's basketball seasons
North Alabama Lions women's basketball
North Alabama Lions women's basketball